The 1966–67 season was the Royals 22nd overall, and their tenth in Cincinnati.

The season opened in the glare of their disappointing loss to Boston in the previous season's playoffs. It was considered a rebuilding season with some key roster changes. Long-time stars Jack Twyman and Wayne Embry had both retired, both unhappy with their roles on the team the previous year. Tom Hawkins had rejoined the contending Los Angeles Lakers.

Local college star Conrad 'Connie' Dierking was promoted to starting center, with promising rookie Walt Wesley his backup. First Team All-Pros Jerry Lucas and Oscar Robertson were again the focus of the team. Happy Hairston and Bobby Love saw minutes at forward next to Lucas, while Adrian Smith and Flynn Robinson saw minutes at guard next to Robertson.

Clearly rebuilding, the Royals had little hope of matching rivals Boston and Philadelphia this season, as they had a season ago. The team finished third in the NBA's Eastern Division.

Individual performances and off-court activities by Robertson and Lucas marked the season. Robertson was head of the NBA's Player Union and fought for the advancement of players' rights on a number of issues. He also posted another Hall Of Fame-caliber season as a scorer, accurate shooter, passer and free thrower. Lucas was involved in several off-court business ventures, including his own fast-food chain, Jerry Lucas Beef-N-Shakes. While injuries affected him this season, he remained one of the best rebounders in NBA history. He also continued to see time at center for the team as well as at forward. Both he and Robertson continued to play huge minutes for the team, rarely leaving the court during games.

Art Modell, head of the NFL Cleveland Browns, agreed to sponsor nine home games at the Cleveland Arena over the course of the season. The Cleveland crowds were consistently among the largest the Royals were cheered by that season.

The Royals made the playoffs for their last time while based in Cincinnati. They drew 68–13 record-setting Philadelphia as their opponent. With a victory on their own court in Game One, the Royals were then routed over the remaining games of the series to conclude their transitional season.

Roster

<noinclude>

Regular season

Season standings

Record vs. opponents

Game log

Playoffs

|- align="center" bgcolor="#ccffcc"
| 1
| March 21
| @ Philadelphia
| W 120–116
| Oscar Robertson (33)
| Dierking, Lucas (18)
| Oscar Robertson (16)
| Philadelphia Convention Hall5,097
| 1–0
|- align="center" bgcolor="#ffcccc"
| 2
| March 22
| Philadelphia
| L 102–123
| Oscar Robertson (29)
| Connie Dierking (17)
| Oscar Robertson (9)
| Cincinnati Gardens5,276
| 1–1
|- align="center" bgcolor="#ffcccc"
| 3
| March 24
| @ Philadelphia
| L 106–121
| Oscar Robertson (25)
| Jerry Lucas (23)
| Oscar Robertson (13)
| Philadelphia Convention Hall8,987
| 1–2
|- align="center" bgcolor="#ffcccc"
| 4
| March 25
| Philadelphia
| L 94–112
| Happy Hairston (26)
| Jerry Lucas (25)
| Oscar Robertson (7)
| Cincinnati Gardens2,624
| 1–3
|-

Player statistics

Season

Playoffs

Awards and records
 Oscar Robertson, All-NBA First Team
 Jerry Lucas, All-NBA Second Team

References

Sacramento Kings seasons
Cincinnati
Cincinnati
Cincinnati